The oceanic eclectus  (Eclectus infectus) is an extinct parrot species which occurred on Tonga, Vanuatu and possibly on Fiji. Its only living relative is the eclectus parrot (Eclectus roratus), which has proportionally larger wings than the oceanic eclectus parrot. The fossil material unearthed in November 1989 in Late Pleistocene and Holocene deposits on 'Eua, Lifuka, 'Uiha and Vanuatu and described in 2006 by David William Steadman include a complete femur, five radii, a quadrate bone, a mandible, a coracoid, two sterna, two humeri, two ulnae, two tibiotarsi, a carpometacarpus, a tarsometatarsus, and three pedal phalanges.

The oceanic eclectus parrot became extinct on Tonga during the early settlement 3000 years ago, presumably due to human-caused factors. On Vava'u, it may have survived into historic times because among the drawings which were created in 1793 during Alessandro Malaspina's Pacific expedition, there is one sketch which appears to portray an Oceanic eclectus parrot.

Fossil remains of  the oceanic eclectus (Eclectus infectus), have been found in archaeological sites in the islands of Tonga and Vanuatu. The species presumably existed in Fiji, as well. E. infectus had proportionally smaller wings than the 	Moluccan eclectus. The species became extinct after the arrival of humans 3000 years ago, presumably due to human-caused factors (habitat loss, introduced species).

References

Oceanic eclectus parrot
†
†
†
Extinct birds of Oceania
Late Quaternary prehistoric birds
Holocene extinctions
Fossil taxa described in 2006
Oceanic eclectus parrot